The Benetton B193 is a Formula One racing car with which the Benetton team competed in the 1993 Formula One World Championship. Designed by Ross Brawn and Rory Byrne, the car was powered by the latest Cosworth HBA engine in an initially-exclusive deal with Ford, and ran on Goodyear tyres. It was driven by German Michael Schumacher and veteran Italian Riccardo Patrese.

Overview
The car was distinguishable from its predecessor due to its track being  narrower per the regulations of 1993, and the addition of bargeboards at the Monaco Grand Prix. It also had sidepods with a less pronounced cut-in for the radiator ducts. The nose height was raised from that of the B192, as well as having a longer and flatter rear 'deck' to allow for smoother airflow over the rear suspension than the B192.

The standard rear-wing endplate profile was also changed, featuring a straight leading edge rather than the curved design of the B192. Later in the season, this would further change with the addition of the 'forward wing'; an additional cantilevered wing used on high-downforce tracks, mounted forward and above the main plane, attached via endplate extensions.
The leading edge of the front wing now also followed a straight profile, rather than curving forward towards the endplates. The leading edge of the nose also followed a smoother curved profile, whereas the B192 was flatter at its tip.

In terms of performance, it was an improvement on the 1992 competitor. 

Thanks to the more powerful engine, Michael Schumacher was able to consistently challenge the McLarens and on occasion challenged the seemingly unbeatable Williams FW15C.

It is arguable that it was overall the second most competitive car on the grid, behind the Williams, with Schumacher regularly scoring podiums and out-qualifying the single-lap ace Ayrton Senna in 8 of the 16 races of the season. Having access to the most potent factory engine in contrast to McLaren having to make do with older-specification units gave Benetton a power advantage, (although Williams used a far superior Renault V10), however, the McLaren had the edge at some races, in particular in wet conditions due in part to their use of traction control. Due to McLaren's early-season results (achieved in part against the B193A run in South Africa and Brazil) McLaren were able successfully lobby Ford to provide engines of equal-spec to Benetton from Silverstone onward, with both running the Series VIII of the HB V8, where previously Benetton's exclusive deal had seen McLaren using the Series VII which Benetton also ran in the B192/B193A.

The car was very advanced in the technological sense and featured active suspension, semi-automatic transmission, and traction control, from the Monaco Grand Prix onwards, although Riccardo Patrese did later say that the car was a step down in quality compared to the much more sophisticated Williams cars he had been driving for the previous five years.

A variant of this car, the B193C was used as a test mule for an innovative four-wheel steering system and was tested by Schumacher and Patrese at Estoril. Four-wheel steering had been introduced on some of Nissan and Toyota's production cars. Patrese both found the system to not add anything to the performance of the car and actually slowed the car through slower corners; however Schumacher preferred the system as estimated a gain 3 tenths of a second per lap. The system was built onto Schumacher's race car for Japan and Australia, but he failed to complete either race (this wasn't the fault of the 4WS system, but rather because of an accident and engine failure, respectively). The system would only have been legal for those 2 races; advanced technologies to aid drivers were banned for the 1994 season.

It was the last car to feature cigarette brand Camel as the team's main sponsor, before the long term sponsorship of an Enstone-based team with Mild Seven cigarettes.

Benetton eventually finished 3rd in the Constructors' Championship just behind McLaren but with a substantial gap to Williams. The B193B was replaced for the  season by the Benetton B194.

Complete Formula One results
(key) (results in italics indicate fastest lap)

References

External links

B193
1993 Formula One season cars